"Prince" Joe Henry (October 4, 1930 – January 2, 2009) was an American baseball player. He played for several Negro league teams in the 1950s.

Life and sports
Henry was born and raised in Brooklyn, Illinois, where he played softball as a youngster. He was discovered by catcher Josh Johnson, who encouraged him to try baseball. Goose Curry scouted him to play in the Negro leagues, starting him off in a Mississippi baseball school. He played for three years with the Memphis Red Sox, then signed a minor league contract, playing in 1952 in the Mississippi–Ohio Valley League for Canton and in 1953 for Mount Vernon. During these years he sustained injuries that prevented him from playing further in the minors. He returned to the Negro leagues in 1955–56 with the Indianapolis Clowns, but did not play for most of 1957 until he was convinced to return and play with the Detroit Stars. In 1958 he was selected as an All-Star for the East-West All Star Game. His last year in the Negro leagues was 1959.

Late in his life, Henry fought a long battle with Major League Baseball to secure pension benefits that the league promised Negro league players in the 1990s. In the 2000s, Henry began authoring a newspaper column for the St. Louis, Missouri, Riverfront Times (with the help of his grandson, Sean R. Muhammad) called "Ask a Negro Leaguer". He died January 2, 2009, after a sustained illness.

References
Footnotes

External links
Joe Henry at the Negro League Baseball Players Association
Article from Riverfront Times

1930 births
2009 deaths
Memphis Red Sox players
Indianapolis Clowns players
Detroit Stars players
People from Brooklyn, Illinois
African-American writers
American writers
Writers from Illinois
Baseball infielders
Baseball players from Illinois
20th-century African-American sportspeople
21st-century African-American people